Senator Costello may refer to:

Herman T. Costello (1920–2017), New Jersey State Senate
Mark Costello (Iowa politician) (born 1961), Iowa State Senate
Mia Costello (born 1968), Alaska State Senate